Grevillea agrifolia, the blue grevillea, is a species of flowering plant in the family Proteaceae and is native to the north of Western Australia and parts of the Northern Territory. It is a shrub or tree with narrowly oblong leaves with the narrower end towards the base, and creamy-yellow flowers.

Description

Taxonomy
Grevillea agrifolia was first formally described in 1830 in Robert Brown's from an unpublished description by Allan Cunningham and the description was published in Supplementum primum prodromi florae Novae Hollandiae. The specific epithet (agrifolia) means "wounded leaves", referring to the type specimens.

In 2000, Robert Owen Makinson described two subspecies of G. agrifolia and the names are accepted by the Australian Plant Census:

Grevillea microcarpa was first formally described in 1993 by Peter M. Olde and Neil R. Marriott in the journal Telopea but in 2000 was reduced to G. agrifolia subsp. microcarpa by Makinson in the Flora of Australia.

Distribution and habitat
Blue grevillea grows in rocky places in coastal areas and near water in the Kimberley region of Western Australia and in the Victoria River district in the Northern Territory. Subspecies microcarpa is restricted to the area between Napier Broome Bay and the King Edward and Drysdale Rivers in the northern Kimberley region.

References

agrifolia
Eudicots of Western Australia
Flora of the Northern Territory
Proteales of Australia
Plants described in 1830
Taxa named by Robert Brown (botanist, born 1773)